Sonid Left Banner (Mongolian:    Söned Jegün qosiɣu) is a banner of north-central Inner Mongolia, People's Republic of China, bordering the Republic of Mongolia's provinces of Dornogovi to the west and Sükhbaatar to the north. It is under the administration of Xilin Gol League. Sunud Mongols live here.

Climate
Sonid Left Banner features a cold semi-arid climate (Köppen BSk), marked by long, cold and very dry winters, hot, somewhat humid summers, and strong winds, especially in spring.

See also
Honggor Sum

References

www.xzqh.org 

Banners of Inner Mongolia